Xerochrysum viscosum (syn. Bracteantha viscosa (DC.) Anderb., Helichrysum viscosum Sieber ex Spreng., Helichrysum bracteatum var. viscosum Sieber ex DC., sticky everlasting) is a flowering plant in the family Asteraceae, native to Australia, growing in Victoria and New South Wales.

It is a sticky everlasting erect viscid herb. It is usually annual, though sometimes perennial, mainly flowers in spring and summer. Inflorescence bracts are papery and yellow in colour.

References

External links

viscosum
Flora of New South Wales
Flora of Victoria (Australia)